Jacob Rafael Conde (born October 13, 1992) is a former Puerto Rican football player. He played in England, Spain and Croatia, as well as his native United States.

Career statistics

Club

Notes

International

References

External links
 Jacob Conde at the Medaille College

1992 births
Living people
Puerto Rican footballers
Puerto Rican expatriate footballers
Puerto Rico international footballers
American soccer players
American expatriate soccer players
American sportspeople of Puerto Rican descent
Association football defenders
Soccer players from Connecticut
Sportspeople from Hartford, Connecticut
American expatriate sportspeople in England
Expatriate footballers in England
Puerto Rican expatriate sportspeople in Spain
American expatriate sportspeople in Spain
Expatriate footballers in Spain
American expatriate sportspeople in Croatia
Expatriate footballers in Croatia